The incumbent Maharashtra Chief Minister Ashok Chavan led his Congress party and alliance partner NCP to an electoral majority in the 2009 Maharashtra Legislative Assembly election. He subsequently formed his second cabinet. Chavan had been the Chief Minister since December 8, 2008, and would continue to serve until November 9, 2010, when he resigned at the backdrop of corruption allegations.

The cabinet consisted of 23 ministers, including Chavan and his Deputy, Chhagan Bhujbal.

Council of Ministers
The following is the list of ministers in the cabinet:

Cabinet Ministers

Ministers of State

Ministers by Party

Guardian Ministers

References

Indian National Congress
2009 in Indian politics
C
Nationalist Congress Party
Cabinets established in 2009
Cabinets disestablished in 2010
2009 establishments in Maharashtra
2010 disestablishments in India